Lopadops is a genus of flies in the family Pyrgotidae.

Species 
L. nigerrimus Enderlein, 1942

References 

Pyrgotidae
Diptera of South America
Brachycera genera
Taxa named by Günther Enderlein